S. sarda  may refer to:
 Sarda sarda, the Atlantic bonito, a fish species
 Splendrillia sarda, a sea snail species
 Sylvia sarda, the Marmora's warbler, a bird species found on Mediterranean islands, typically including Corsica and Sardinia

See also
 Sarda (disambiguation)